Water polo at the 1980 Summer Olympics as usual was a part of the swimming sport, other two parts were swimming and diving. They were not three separate sports, because they all were governed by one federation — FINA. Water Polo discipline consisted of one event: men's team. In the preliminary round 12 teams were divided into three groups. Two best teams from each group (shaded ones) advanced to Group A of the final round to determine places 1 through 6. The rest of teams played in Group B of the final round to determine places 7 through 12.

The event was held between 20 and 29 July in two venues:
the Swimming Pool of the Olimpiysky Sports Complex (central part of Moscow)
the Outdoor Swimming Pool of the Central Lenin Stadium at Luzhniki (south-western part of Moscow)

Medals

Qualification

Results

Preliminary round

Group A

Group B

Group C

Final round

Group A

Group B

Final ranking

Team rosters

See also
1978 FINA Men's World Water Polo Championship
1982 FINA Men's World Water Polo Championship

References

Sources
 PDF documents in the LA84 Foundation Digital Library:
 Official Report of the 1980 Olympic Games, v.3 (download, archive) (pp. 458, 495–510)
 Water polo on the Olympedia website
 Water polo at the 1980 Summer Olympics (men's tournament)
 Water polo on the Sports Reference website
 Water polo at the 1980 Summer Games (men's tournament) (archived)

External links
Official Olympic Report

 
1980 Summer Olympics events
O
1980 Summer Olympics
1980 Summer Olympics